The Aztec Motel, also known as the Aztec Auto Court or Aztec Lodge, was a historic motel located on former U.S. Route 66 in the Upper Nob Hill neighborhood of Albuquerque, New Mexico, United States. Until its demolition in 2011 it was the oldest continuously-operating Route 66 motel in New Mexico and "one of the five most important motels left" in Albuquerque.

History
The Aztec Motel was built in 1932 as the first of what would eventually be dozens of auto courts lining Central Avenue, which became U.S. Route 66 4 years later. During a remodeling of the building in the 1950s, the garages were walled in, bringin the number of units from 13 to 17, and a new neon sign replaced the original one.

It was listed on the New Mexico State Register of Cultural Properties  and the National Register of Historic Places in 1993. The building was well known locally for its exterior decorations, which consisted of hundreds of found objects assembled in the 1990s by a resident of the motel. The work was described in the Albuquerque Journal as a "beloved local folk art installation".

In 2003, the Aztec Motel received a fund from the National Park Service Route 66 Corridor Preservation Program to restore its neon sign.

The Aztec Motel was razed in early June 2011. The motel's owners cited its deteriorating condition and high maintenance costs as reasons for the demolition, estimating the building would cost $1 million to renovate. The motel's neon sign was left standing and was intended to be part of future development on the site. However, the sign ended up being removed in March 2015. The city declared its intention to restore and reinstall it at a to-be-determined location.

See also
 List of motels

References

Hotel buildings completed in 1932
Buildings and structures demolished in 2011
Hotel buildings on the National Register of Historic Places in New Mexico
Hotels established in 1932
Motels in the United States

U.S. Route 66 in New Mexico
Tourist attractions along U.S. Route 66
New Mexico State Register of Cultural Properties
Demolished buildings and structures in New Mexico
National Register of Historic Places in Albuquerque, New Mexico
Hotels in Albuquerque, New Mexico
Defunct hotels in the United States
Demolished hotels in the United States